Ferocactus echidne is a barrel cactus in the genus Ferocactus.  It is found in nature in Mexico.  This cactus is known commonly as Sonora barrel, Coville's barrel cactus, Emory's barrel cactus, and traveler's friend.

Alternatively it has been assigned the binomials Echinocactus emoryi, Ferocactus rectispinus, and Ferocactus covillei.

This plant is often sold as a houseplant.

echidne
Cacti of Mexico
Flora of Sonora